NHC could refer to:

 Nag Hammadi Codex, or Nag Hammadi Codices (e.g. NHC II, NHC XIII)
 New Hanover County, a county in North Carolina
 New Haven County, a county in Connecticut.
 The National Humanities Center in North Carolina
 The National Hurricane Center of the United States
 The Naval Historical Center of the United States
 National Hamster Council, an organization in the United Kingdom
 The National Health Council of the United States
 The Natural Health Center in Portland, Oregon
 The National Health Commission of the China
 The National Housing Conference in Washington, D.C.
 The National Hockey Center in St. Cloud, Minnesota
 N-Heterocyclic carbene, a persistent carbene, commonly used as ligand in organometallic chemistry
 Nearly a Haskell Compiler, for Acorn A5000 personal computers
 New Hampshire College, the former name of what is now called Southern New Hampshire University, a private university in Manchester, New Hampshire
 No Homers Club (NoHomers.net), a large Internet forum devoted to discussing The Simpsons
 North Harris College, now Lone Star College-North Harris
 North Hertfordshire College in north Hertfordshire, England
 Nsambya Home Care of Nsambya Hospital, Uganda
 NHC band, formed in 2021 by Dave Navarro, Taylor Hawkins and Chris Chaney.